Filipino Canadians (French: Canadiens philippins; Filipino: Mga Pilipinong Kanadyense) are Canadians of Filipino descent. Filipino Canadians are the fourth largest subgroup of the overseas Filipinos and one of the fastest-growing groups in Canada.

Only a small population of Filipinos lived in Canada until the late 20th century. At the 2016 Canadian census, 851,410 people of Filipino descent lived in Canada, mostly in urban areas. Filipino Canadians are the third-largest Asian Canadian group in the nation after the Indian and Chinese communities. They are also the largest group from Southeast Asia in the country. Between the 2011 and 2016 censuses, the Filipino community in Canada grew from 702,200 to 820,100, a growth of about 7%, compared to the rest of Canada, which grew by 5% during the same time period.

By the 2021 census, Filipino Canadians enumerated 957,355, or 2.58% of the total population, further displaying the community's rapid growth.

Early Filipinos in British Columbia

Filipino migration to North America began with Philippine-made ships crossing the Pacific Ocean during the Manila galleon trade.  As early as 1565, Spain began sending vessels northeast from the Philippines, riding the Kuroshio Current in a sweeping circular route across the northern part of the Pacific. Filipino servants, stowaways, and mariners arrived in parts of the west coast of North America, from what is now Mexico to as far north as Alaska. By late 1700s, "Manila men" were recruited in naval operations, aboard the ship San Carlos el Filipino sent to support the short-lived Spanish settlement of Santa Cruz de Nuca and Fort San Miguel, Nootka Island, off the coast of Vancouver.

Canada's earliest documented Filipinos coincided with North America's first wave of Asian immigration in the 1800s. At least nine male Filipino sailors, aged twenty-four to forty-two, appeared on the 1881 census of British Columbia. Living on a vessel in New Westminster, they were recorded ethno-racially as "Malay" [a loose term to describe Austronesian people] and listed as "Mahomitan" [an archaic term for Muslim].

A small Filipino community resided in Bowen Island, British Columbia in the 1880s. They probably engaged in both fishing and farming. It included Fernando Toreenya, a fisherman who came to Canada from the Philippines in 1886 at the age of 20 years old with his First Nations partner Mary/Marie Adams. They lived in Snug Cove and had three other Filipino boarders living with them, William Matilda, Antoni Bentorre, and Ricardo Castro. Others included Ben Flores, who were "beachcombers and fishermen" and were settled on a barge in Snug Cove; Basinto Pasento, who called his home Pasento Ranch and died in February 1904, John Delmond, and Jose Garcia. Several others worked as loggers, millhand, mine labourers, and longshoremen intermarrying with Indigenous peoples and other Pacific Islanders. By the turn of the century, there was a significant number of Filipinos, who were naturalized as Canadians or were U.S. nationals in the Lower Mainland region of British Columbia.

History of Filipinos in Canada
Larger numbers of Filipinos migrated to Canada in 1930. In 1950, 10 Filipinos were recorded in Manitoba. The first-generation Filipino Canadians were mainly women who worked as nurses and teachers and in the health sector. These first Filipinos came from the United States to renew their visas after they had expired in the hope of returning to the U.S. Most of them returned, but some stayed in Canada.

From 1946 to 1964, the total number of Filipinos in Canada was 770. In the 1960s, Canada recruited more professionals, mostly from the United States, with some coming directly from the Philippines. Most of the nurses, technicians, office workers and doctors arrived in Winnipeg, Manitoba. In the late 1960s, more Filipinos came to Winnipeg to work in the garment industry.

During the 1970s, most Filipinos came directly from the Philippines to Winnipeg to work in clerical, sales and manufacturing fields. In the late 1970s, more Filipinos came to join their relatives who worked in Canada under the family reunification program. More and more Filipinos decided to settle in Ontario, particularly in Toronto, where jobs were prospering.

In the 1980s, Canada saw an influx of Filipino contract workers, many who found work as live-in caregivers. Many of the contract workers later became landed immigrants under the Live-In Caregiver Program.

During the 1990s, more Filipinos came as families and independents instead of being sponsored by family or being recruited as contract workers.

From 1990 onward, there has been a steady flow of Filipinos entering Canada, with about 10,000 to 20,000 coming in every year. In December 2008, the Philippines passed China as Canada's leading source of immigrants.

Wealth, education, and socioeconomics

As of 2016, Filipino Canadians are a relatively recent immigrant group with the majority immigrating after the 2000s; most identify as first-generation or generation 1.5 immigrants. Out of the 780,130 Filipino Canadians, only 13,125 considered themselves third-generation. While racialized poverty tends to be higher for first-generation immigrants of any ethnic group, Filipino Canadians paradoxically show low poverty rates among all generations relative to other visible minorities.

In 2015, Filipino Canadians experienced a 7.4% poverty rate which was the lowest among all visible minorities. The non-racialized poverty rate was 12.2%. Filipino Canadian men and women were the least likely among all visible minorities to be unemployed at 5.8% and 4.7% respectively.

In Metro Vancouver, nine out of ten Filipino immigrants are employed within five years of arriving in the city, less than 10 per cent are classified as low income, and six in ten own their homes.

Filipino Canadians are more likely than the overall Canadian population to have at least a bachelor's degree or higher.

Filipino Canadians are more likely to work in the health care industry and the social assistance industry (20.6%) than some other visible minorities.

Immigration

Greater Toronto Area

The Greater Toronto Area (GTA), which includes the city of Toronto, and the regional municipalities of Durham, Halton, Peel, and York, is home to the largest Filipino community in Canada with a third of all Filipino Canadians calling the GTA home. As of the 2016 Census, there were 282,385 people of Filipino descent living in the GTA making them the fourth largest visible minority group behind the Indian, Chinese, and Black communities. The number of Filipino Canadians in the GTA grew from 252,120 in 2011 to 282,385 in 2016 representing a growth of 12% in 5 years.

Tagalog is the fifth most spoken language, other than English or French, to be spoken in the GTA, and is also one of the fastest-growing languages in the region. Other Philippine languages, such as Ilocano, and Cebuano, also have a sizeable number of speakers throughout the region.

A huge percentage of the Filipino diaspora in GTA are working professionals. Several Filipino-owned business have also sprouted all over the metropolitan area. In 2017, Seafood City, a Filipino owned supermarket chain in the United States, opened its first Canadian location in Mississauga. Other Filipino establishments like Jollibee, CrispyTown, Grill City, Philippine National Bank, among others, have also established roots in GTA.

Filipinos from the GTA have made significant contributions to the Canadian political landscape. Notable Toronto residents include Tobias Enverga the first Canadian of Filipino descent to be elected in the City of Toronto and to be appointed to the Senate of Canada, Brampton City Councillor Rowena Santos, Town of Ajax Ward 3 Councillor Lisa Bower, and TCDSB trustee Garry Tanuan.

Population distribution
Filipinos are generally well spread out throughout the GTA, with a few areas of concentration. In the city of Toronto, the former municipalities of Scarborough and North York are popular destinations for new Filipino immigrants, and naturalized Filipino Canadians alike. According to the 2016 Census, Tagalog is the most common non-English mother tongue language, in the following neighbourhoods:
 Clanton Park (11.2%)
 Briar Hill-Belgravia (10.4%)
 Englemount-Lawrence (10.1%)
 Ionview (9.4%)
 Kennedy Park (8.2%)
 North St. James Town (8.1%)
 Forest Hill North (6.9%)
 Wexford-Maryvale (6.8%)
 Humewood-Cedarvale (6.0%)
 West Hill (4.7%)
 Bedford Park-Nortown (4.2%)
 Guildwood (2.2%)
 Forest Hill South (2.0%)
Other Philippine languages also ranked among the most common non-English mother tongue languages. Ilocano ranked in the top 10 non-English mother tongue languages in 3 neighbourhoods (Briar Hill-Belgravia, Englemount-Lawrence, Clanton Park). Cebuano also ranked in the top 10 languages for the Briar Hill-Belgravia neighbourhood.

Outside of the city of Toronto, Mississauga and Brampton in Peel Region, Markham and Vaughan in York Region, Ajax and Pickering in Durham Region, and Milton in Halton Region have large percentages of Filipino residents.

As of the 2016 Canadian Census:

City of Toronto
Total - 162,600 (6.0% of total population)
Durham Region
Total – 16,270 (2.5%)
Halton Region
Total – 12,225 (2.2%)
Peel Region
Total – 62,460 (4.5%)
York Region
Total – 28,830 (2.6%)

Metro Vancouver
Vancouver is home to Canada's second largest Filipino community, with nearly 134,000 Filipinos residing there. Filipinos in Vancouver make up the third-largest Asian Canadian and visible minority group behind the Chinese and South Asians. Most of British Columbia's 159,000 Filipinos reside in the Greater Vancouver Area. Overall, about one in five Filipinos in Canada call Metro Vancouver home.

Filipinos, along many other Asian Canadians, contribute to the city's economy greatly with their work ethic. Many of the Filipinos in Vancouver work in the health and finance industry, with also a significant percentage that work in service, manufacturing, and real estate. Several others are business owners, with some bringing in well known franchise chains like Pepper Lunch and Chatime to the city. Qoola, a local frozen yogurt chain with over 20 locations, is also founded by a Manila-born businessman. Big restaurant names like Max's of Manila, and soon, Jollibee, have also set their presence in the city.

In addition, Vancouver is home to Canada's first Goldilocks Bakeshop franchise. Ayala Land, the Philippines' leading Real Estate developer company, recently completed a mix-use residential development with local real estate developer company, Rize, in Vancouver's Mt. Pleasant neighbourhood.

Winnipeg
Winnipeg is home to 77,305 Filipinos, making up the third largest Filipino community in Canada by total population. However, Filipinos make up a greater percentage of the Winnipeg population (8.7%) than any other city in Canada. The Filipino community in Winnipeg is the largest visible minority group in Winnipeg ahead of the Chinese-Canadians and Indo-Canadians (but excluding Indigenous Canadians, who are not counted as a "visible minority" by Statistics Canada). Winnipeg is home to the oldest Filipino community in Canada with  immigration to Winnipeg beginning before 1950. Winnipeg was home to the largest Filipino community before the 1980s. About 1 out of 10 Filipinos in Canada call Winnipeg home. There is also Filipino community center called The Philippine Canadian Centre of Manitoba (PCCM) providing social and service to the Filipino community and also holds events such as Folklorama. There are also Filipino newspapers such as The Pilipino Express News Magazine, The Filipino Journal, and Ang Peryodiko. There is also a radio station, CKJS, which broadcasts Filipino related news, music, lifestyle and much more.

Winnipeg's Filipino population is largely concentrated in the West End and North End areas of the city. The neighbourhood around Sargent Avenue and Arlington Street is 45% Filipino, and the neighbourhood around Sargent Avenue and Wall Street is 47% Filipino.

Filipinos in Winnipeg contribute greatly to the local economy. Jollibee, a well known global Filipino fast food chain, has its first 2 Canadian locations established in this city.

Calgary Metropolitan Region
Calgary is home to over 75,000 Filipinos making them the fourth largest Filipino community in Canada. Filipinos started coming in droves in Calgary in the early 1980s and 1990s. Outside of Calgary, some smaller communities are experiencing an influx of Filipino immigrants to fill job vacancies. These new immigrants and their children work to integrate and flourish in Canada.

Edmonton Metropolitan Region
According to the 2016 Canadian census, 64,275 Filipinos live and work in the Edmonton Metropolitan Region. Various Filipino associations celebrate the culture and take part in large metropolitan events such as the Edmonton Heritage Festival. In 2002, the Filipino community presented its home nation as the "Featured Country" during Capital Ex (formerly Klondike Days). Edmonton is also the home of the Philippine Cultural Society, the Philippine Choral Society, and the Karilagan Dance Society.

Radio station CKER-FM also broadcasts community programming to Filipinos in Edmonton.

Greater Montreal
The sixth largest Filipino community in Canada, Montreal is home to nearly 36,000 Filipinos. Filipinos in Montreal are concentrated in the Snowdon neighbourhood and around Decarie Expressway, both areas have many Filipino establishments and professional offices. The Filipino Association of Montreal and Suburbs is an advocacy group for Filipino Canadians active in and around the city of Montreal. It is the oldest such association in Quebec.

National Capital Region
The National Capital Region made up of the cities of Ottawa, Ontario and Gatineau, Quebec is home to the seventh largest Filipino community in Canada with over 14,000 Filipinos residing in Canada's capital. Ottawa is also the home of the Philippine Embassy and ambassador to Canada.

Southwestern Ontario
Southwestern Ontario is home to over 15,000 Filipinos. Most of them live in the cities of Cambridge, Guelph, Kitchener, London, and Windsor. Southwestern Ontario is home to a successful and thriving Filipino community.

Hamilton
The city of Hamilton situated on the western shore of Lake Ontario is home to almost 12,000 Filipinos. Hamilton is home to the first Filipino community centre and school in Canada both opening in the early 80s and late 70s, respectively.

Niagara Region
The Niagara Region on the south shore of Lake Ontario is home to over 4,000 Filipinos. They form a tight knit community concentrated in the cities of St. Catharines and Niagara Falls. Niagara-on-the-lake is home to a very successful community and the only town to have had a Filipino mayor in Canada, Arturo Viola.

Northern Canada
The northern territories of Yukon, Northwest Territories, and Nunavut have a Filipino community of almost 3,000 despite an extremely cold climate. The Filipino community has grown steadily from 735 in 2001. Filipinos in the Northwest Territories make the largest visible minority group there with a population of 1,410. Filipinos in the Yukon Territory are the second-largest minority group to the Chinese with a community of 1,310 living there. Nunavut has a growing Filipino population of 245. The territories received about 50 Filipinos on average a year from 2001 to 2006.

Demographics
Most Filipinos who immigrate to Canada settle in the large urban areas where there are more jobs and a vibrant community life. These areas include: Metro Vancouver, Greater Calgary, Edmonton Capital Region, City of Winnipeg, the Greater Toronto Area, and Greater Montreal. According to Statistics Canada seeing the current trend, by 2031, the Filipino Canadian population is projected to reach between 1.9 and 2.1 million. Much of this growth will be bolstered by high immigration rates, assuming immigration to the United States remains as restricted as it has been. Notably, Canada now has a Filipino population more than twice as large percentage-wise as that of the United States, the Philippines' former colonizer, it is also somewhat more dispersed, as the majority of Filipino Americans are found in the far western United States.

2011 Canadian census
Toronto – 132,445 (5.1%)
Winnipeg – 56,400 (8.7%)
Calgary – 47,350 (4.4%)
Mississauga – 39,800 (5.6%)
Edmonton – 36,565 (4.6%)
Vancouver – 35,490 (6.0%)
Surrey – 26,480 (5.7%)
Montreal – 21,750 (1.3%)
Brampton – 17,905 (3.4%)
Burnaby – 12,905 (5.9%)
Richmond – 12,670 (6.7%)
Ottawa – 10,530 (1.2%)
Source:

2006 Canadian census

By City
Toronto – 102,555
Winnipeg – 36,820
Mississauga (Toronto CMA) – 30,705
Vancouver – 28,605
Calgary – 24,915
Edmonton – 18,245
Montreal – 17,100
Surrey (Vancouver CMA) – 16,555
Brampton (Toronto CMA) – 11,980
Markham (Toronto CMA) – 7,370
Ottawa – 7,115
Vaughan (Toronto CMA) – 5,360
Hamilton – 4,040
Windsor – 2,630
London – 1,790

By Census Metropolitan Area
Toronto CMA – 171,980
Vancouver CMA – 78,890
Winnipeg CMA – 36,935
Calgary CMA – 25,565
Montreal CMA – 23,510
Edmonton CMA – 19,625
Ottawa – Gatineau CMA – 7,330
Hamilton CMA – 4,880
Windsor CMA – 3,145
Victoria CMA – 2,760
Oshawa CMA – 2,155
St. Catharines – Niagara CMA – 2,130
London CMA – 1,990
Guelph CMA – 1,965
Saskatoon CMA – 1,915
Kitchener-Cambridge-Waterloo CMA – 1,850
Regina CMA – 1,230

By province/territory

The majority of Filipino-Canadians are women who make up about 65% of the population.

By gender

Male – 175,640
Female – 235,055

Canadian census subdivisions with Filipino populations higher than the national average
Source: 2011 Canadian censusNational average: 1.4%

Alberta
 Banff
 Lloydminster
 Chestermere
 Edmonton
 Calgary
 Slave Lake
 Wetaskiwin
 Wood Buffalo
 Ponoka
 Red Deer

British Columbia
 New Westminster
 Richmond
 North Vancouver (city)
 Vancouver
 Burnaby
 Surrey
 Coquitlam
 Pitt Meadows
 Port Coquitlam
 Whistler
 Squamish
 Delta
 North Vancouver (district municipality)

Manitoba
 Winnipeg
 Steinbach

Northwest Territories
 Yellowknife

Ontario
 Mississauga
 Toronto
 Ajax
 Brampton
 Pickering
 Milton
 Markham
 Vaughan
 Richmond Hill

Quebec
 Côte-des-Neiges–Notre-Dame-de-Grâce
 Dollard-des-Ormeaux
 Dorval
 Côte Saint-Luc

Saskatchewan
 North Battleford

Yukon
 Whitehorse

Notable people

Mikey Bustos, Comedian 
 Steve A. Coroza - first Filipino Canadian appointed to the judicial Bench in Canada (Ontario Court of Appeal) 
 L. Bernette Ho - second Filipina Canadian appointed to the judicial Bench in Canada (Alberta Court of Appeal) 
 Aubrey Danielle Hilliard - third Filipina Canadian appointed to the judicial Bench in Canada (Ontario Courts of Justice) 
 Gail Gatchalian - fourth Filipina Canadian appointed to the judicial Bench in Canada (Nova Scotia Supreme Court) 
 Fay Faraday - Filipina Armenian social justice lawyer and assistant professor at Osgoode Hall Law School.

See also

Overseas Filipinos
Canada–Philippines relations
Asian Canadians
Asian Americans

References

Further reading

External links
History of Filipino Canadians

Asian Canadian
Ethnic groups in Canada
 
 
Canada